Asadabad-e Arab (also Romanized as Asadābād-e Arab; also known as Asadābād and Kalāt-e Asadābād) is a village in Shusef Rural District, Shusef District, Nehbandan County, South Khorasan Province, Iran. At the 2006 census, its population was 72, in 20 families.

References 

Populated places in Nehbandan County